Pirani Ameena Begum (Hindustani:  / ; born Ora Ray Baker; 8 May 1892 – 1 May 1949) was the wife of Sufi Master Inayat Khan and the mother of their four children: World War II SOE agent Noor-un-Nisa (1914-1944), Vilayat (1916-2004), Hidayat (1917-2016) and Khair-un-Nisa (Claire) (1919-2011).

Life
Baker first met Khan in New York in 1911 when her half-brother and guardian, Pierre Bernard, engaged the master musician and mystic to teach his ward Indian music. However, he forbade the marriage and Khan sailed for London. Baker found his Indian home address among Bernard's papers when cleaning his desk; the letter was forwarded and she sailed for England alone. They married in 1913 in London, at which point she took the name "Ameena Begum". After living in London and then Paris, they traveled to Moscow, where she gave birth to Noor (January 1, 1914) the new family returned to Paris in July. World War I started in August and they left for England where they remained for the duration of the war. She left a collection of 101 poems, "A Rosary of one hundred and one beads". Some poems were lost during World War II, but 54 have been preserved and were published in 1998. She was a cousin of Mary Baker Eddy, founder of the Christian Science Church in the USA.

Hidayat Inayat Khan wrote: "In 1926, Hazrat Inayat Khan gave my Mother an exceptional initiation as "Pirani", which was only to be given to her. That special initiation was not to be given to any one else in the Sufi Movement, either in  the present or in the future". Hazrat Inayat Khan said in his Autobiography that without Ameena Begum's help he would never have been able to bring his Sufi Message to the Western world..

Articles and poetry

A Mother's Revelation, by Amina Begum Inayat Khan. "The Sufi" magazine No. 1 Vol. I, Febr. 1915
Women's Seclusion in the East, by Amina Begum Inayat Khan. "The Sufi" magazine No. 3 Vol. I, Sept. 1915
The children of today, by Amina Begum Inayat Khan. "The Sufi" magazine May. 1917
Poems from Thy Rosary of a Hundred Beads, a collection of poems written by 'Sharda, Pirani Ameena Begum Ora-Ray Inayat Khan'. "Caravanseari" magazine (Canada) November 1988 pp. 31–34 
Poems from Thy Rosary of a Hundred Beads by 'Sharda, Pirani Ameena Begum Ora-Ray Inayat Khan'. Published in book of Hidayat Inayat Khan "Once upon a time..." Groningen (Netherlands) 1998 pp. 53–87
Rosary of a Hundred Beads 'Sharda' to 'Daya by Pirani Ameena Begum Ora Ray Baker. Published by Petama books (Zurich) , paperback, 64 p.

References

Sources
 HJ Witteveen. Universal Sufism.
 Russo-Indian Relations in 1900-1917. A Selection of Documents. (in Russian). Moscow: The Oriental Literature (Russian Academy of Science). 1999;  
 Spy Princess: The Life of Noor Inayat Khan. Shrabani Basu. Publisher: Omega Publications, Inc.; 1st edition (1 August 2007); 
  Encyclopedia of Hinduism / Constance A. Jones and James D. Ryan. 2007 Facts On File, Inc. New York  (pp. 70–71)

External links
 bbc.co.uk/timewatch "Noor Inayat Khan: Life of a Spy Princess", bbc.co.uk; accessed 24 September 2016.

1892 births
1949 deaths
American Sufis
American Universalists
Sufi poets
Ināyati Sufis
20th-century American poets
American emigrants to England
American emigrants to France
American women poets
20th-century American women writers